Abbas Guèye (born December 27, 1913, in Dakar, Senegal, and died August 2, 1999, in Dakar) was a politician and trade-unionist from Senegal who served in the French National Assembly from 1951 to 1955. Abbas Guèye was not related to Lamine Guèye (1891–1968), nor of the same political opinion.

References 

 Abbas GUEYE 1st page on the French National Assembly website 
 Abbas GUEYE 2nd page on the French National Assembly website

1913 births
1999 deaths
People from Dakar
People of French West Africa
Senegalese politicians
Deputies of the 2nd National Assembly of the French Fourth Republic